Carolyn Ann Mayer-Beug (December 11, 1952 – September 11, 2001) was a filmmaker and video producer from Santa Monica, California. She died in the September 11 attacks as a passenger of the American Airlines Flight 11.

Career
In addition to her work as video producer, Beug also directed three music videos for country singer Dwight Yoakam: "Ain't That Lonely Yet", "A Thousand Miles from Nowhere" and "Fast as You." Beug co-directed the former two videos with Yoakam and was the sole director of the latter video. She won an MTV Video Music award for the Van Halen music video of the song "Right Now", which she produced. She also served as senior vice president of Walt Disney Records.

Personal life
Beug lived in a Tudor-style home in the North 25th Street neighborhood. She hosted an annual backyard barbecue for the Santa Monica High School cross country and track team, which her daughters captained. Beug was a Latter-day Saint.

Death and legacy

Beug was killed at the age of 48 in the crash of American Airlines Flight 11 in the September 11, 2001 attacks. At the time of her death, Carolyn Beug was working on a children's book about Noah's Ark which was to be told from Noah's wife's point of view.  On the plane with her was her mother, Mary Alice Wahlstrom. Beug was survived by her twin eighteen-year-old daughters Lauren and Lindsey Mayer-Beug, her 13-year-old son, Nick, and her husband, John Beug, a senior vice president in charge of filmed production for Warner Brothers' record division. She was returning home from taking her daughters to college at the Rhode Island School of Design.

At the National 9/11 Memorial, Beug is memorialized at the North Pool, on Panel N-1.

References

External links

Van Halen News Desk article
 

1952 births
2001 deaths
American Airlines Flight 11 victims
People from Santa Monica, California
Latter Day Saints from California
American terrorism victims
Terrorism deaths in New York (state)
20th-century American women singers
20th-century American singers
21st-century American women